Nice to Meet You is the second extended play (EP) by Norwegian electronic dance music band Seeb. It was released on 20 April 2018, and features musicians Skylar Grey, Jay Sean, and Iselin. The first single, "Drink About", was released on 6 April 2018 and featured singer Dagny.

Track listing

Personnel
 Simen Eriksrud, Espen Berg – sampling, programming

Charts

References

2018 EPs